John Goodman is a comedy EP by American drag performer Nina West, released on May 17, 2019.

Composition
Nina West said of the EP, "With John Goodman, it's a comedy album of five songs around themes of people around my size. Lol! Then it also has this idea of pop culture and celebrity. The  is about Sarah Huckabee Sanders so I am using my drag scene to be political, but also having fun with it in the process." The comedy EP focuses on politics and popular culture. The music video for "Hucks", a song about Sarah Huckabee Sanders, features Aurora Sexton, Jackie Beat, and Sherry Vine.

Track listing
Track listing adapted from the iTunes Store All songs written by Nina West, Ashley Levy, and Mark Byers.

Charts

References

External links
 

2019 EPs
Comedy EPs
Nina West albums
Producer Entertainment Group albums